Gairo District is one of the seven districts of the Morogoro Region of Tanzania.  It is located in the northwest corner of Morogoro Region. The administrative seat is in the town of Gairo.

History
Gairo District was formally established when it was gazetted in March 2012.  Prior to that Gairo was a division of Kilosa District.

Administrative subdivisions

Constituencies
For parliamentary elections, Tanzania is divided into constituencies. As of the 2010 elections the area that became Gairo District (formerly part of Kilosa District) had one constituency:
 Gairo Constituency

Divisions
Gairo District is administratively divided into divisions.

Wards
As of 2012, Gairo District was administratively divided into eight wards:

 Gairo
 Mandege
 Rubeho
 Chagongwe
 Chanjale
 Kibedya
 Chakwale
 Iyogwe

Notes

Districts of Morogoro Region
States and territories established in 2012